Rebecca Jayne Steele (born 2 January 1985) is a New Zealand former cricketer who played as a slow left-arm orthodox bowler. She appeared in 2 Test matches, 32 One Day Internationals and 1 Women's Twenty20 International for New Zealand between 2003 and 2005. She is one of thirteen cricketers to have taken a five-wicket haul on their debut in women's Test cricket, taking 5/79 against India. She played domestic cricket for Canterbury.

References

External links

1985 births
Living people
Cricketers from Christchurch
New Zealand women cricketers
New Zealand women Test cricketers
New Zealand women One Day International cricketers
New Zealand women Twenty20 International cricketers
Canterbury Magicians cricketers